The Mali women's national basketball team is the nationally controlled basketball team representing Mali at world basketball competitions for women. The Malian squad had one continental championship, which came in 2007 with a win over host Senegal.

History
The Malian squad won a medal at only two continental tournaments with a bronze medal at the 1968 games and a gold at the 2007 games. The squad qualified for its first Olympic appearance with a win at the 2007 African championship. At the 2010 FIBA World Championship for Women they finished in 15th place.

FIBA Africa Championship for Women 2007
Mali traveled to Senegal for the FIBA Africa Championship for Women 2007 qualifying tournament for the 2008 Summer Olympics in Beijing. The squad won the first round with a 4–1 record, losing only to host Senegal. Mali also had the highest positive point differential of any squad in the tournament. In the ensuing rounds, Mali beat Cameroon, followed by Angola. In the championship match, Mali beat Senegal 63–56, qualifying automatically for the 2008 Olympics for the first time. Captain Hamchétou Maïga was voted the MVP of the tournament, while teammate Diéné Diawara grabbed the most rebounds.

Competitive record

FIBA World Cup

Summer Olympics

African Championship
 1968 – 3rd
 1970 – 4th
 1974 – 8th
 1977 – 7th
 1981 – 4th
 1984 – 4th
 1993 – 7th
 1997 – 6th
 2000 – 9th
 2003 – 5th
 2005 – 5th
 2007 – 1st
 2009 – 2nd
 2011 – 3rd
 2013 – 5th
 2015 – 5th
 2017 – 3rd
 2019 – 3rd
 2021 – 2nd
 2023 – Qualified

Current roster
Roster for the 2022 FIBA Women's Basketball World Cup.

References

External links
FIBA profile

 
national
Women's national basketball teams